Marti G. Subrahmanyam is the Charles E. Merrill Professor of Finance at the Stern School of Business at New York University. He also teaches for the Master of Science in Global Finance (MSGF), which is a joint program between Stern and the Hong Kong University of Science and Technology.  Professor Subrahmanyam is best known for his research in the areas of corporate finance, capital markets and international finance.

Biography
Professor Subrahmanyam holds a Ph.D. from the MIT Sloan School of Management, an MBA from the Indian Institute of Management and a BTech in Mechanical Engineering from IIT Madras.

He has been teaching at the Stern School of Business since 1974. He has also been a visiting professor at academic institutions around the world like the Indian Institute of Management, Ahmedabad, University of Melbourne in Australia, LUISS in Italy and Singapore Management University in Singapore.

Prof. Subrahmanyam currently serves on the editorial boards of several academic journals. He is the co-editor of the Review of Derivatives Research and has served as an associate editor of European Financial Management, Journal of Banking and Finance, Journal of Business Finance and Accounting, Journal of Derivatives, Journal of Finance, Journal of International Finance and Accounting, Management Science. He has won many teaching awards including New York University's Distinguished Teaching Medal.

Prof. Subrahmanyam is also on the board of several firms including ICICI Bank, Infosys Technologies, Metahelix Life Science (P) Ltd, Murugappa Group Corporate Board, Nomura Asset Management (U.S.A) Inc, Nexgen Financial Holdings Ltd, SupplyChainge  Inc, and Usha Communications Inc.

Works
Financial Options: From Theory to Practice, Richard D Irwin, 1990. , 
Financial Risk and Derivatives, Springer, 1996. , .
Derivative Valuation & Hedging a Trade: A Trader's Perspective, John Wiley & Sons, 2002. , .

References

External links
Homepage of Marti G Subrahmanyam
Marti Subrahmanyam as Infosys Director
Master of Science in Global Finance

Living people
American economics writers
American male writers of Indian descent
American finance and investment writers
American Hindus
MIT Sloan School of Management alumni
New York University faculty
American business theorists
IIT Madras alumni
Corporate finance theorists
American academics of Indian descent
American male non-fiction writers
Year of birth missing (living people)